Veera Jagathis is a 1938 Tamil language film T. P. Kailasam and R. Prakash. It stars V. S. M. Rajarama Iyer and M. G. Ramachandran.

Production 
Veera Jagathis was directed by T. P. Kailasam and R. Prakash. It was produced under the banner V. S. Talkies. V. S. M. Rajarama Iyer and M. G. Ramachandran were actors in the film.

References 

1930s Tamil-language films
1938 films
Indian black-and-white films